Otar Eloshvili (born 15 November 1978 in Vladikavkaz, Soviet Union) is a Georgian rugby union player who plays as a centre and as a wing.

Eloshvili played in France for Compiègne, Rugby Club d'Arras, in 2006/07, Sporting Nazairien Rugby (2007/08-2008/09), Marcq en Barouel (2009/10) and currently for Grasse, since 2010/11.

He has 11 caps for Georgia, with 2 tries scored, 10 points in aggregate, from 2002 to 2007. He was present at the 2003 Rugby World Cup, playing one match, and at the 2007 Rugby World Cup, playing three matches. He suffered a 7-week ban after a spear tackle during the 64-7 loss to France. He wasn't called again for his national team after that.

External links
Otar Eloshvili international statistics

1978 births
Living people
Rugby union players from Georgia (country)
Rugby union centres
Rugby union wings
Expatriate rugby union players from Georgia (country)
Expatriate rugby union players in France
Expatriate sportspeople from Georgia (country) in France
Georgia international rugby union players